Department of Cultural Affairs may refer to:

New York City Department of Cultural Affairs
Department of Cultural Affairs (Kerala)
Nevada Department of Cultural Affairs
Iowa Department of Cultural Affairs
New Mexico Department of Cultural Affairs
Department of Cultural Affairs, Taipei City Government